The 2017 Southern Utah Thunderbirds football team represented Southern Utah University in the 2017 NCAA Division I FCS football season. They were led by second-year head coach Demario Warren and played their home games at Eccles Coliseum in Cedar City, Utah as sixth-year as members of the Big Sky Conference. They finished the season 9–3, 7–1 in Big Sky play to earn a share of the conference championship with Weber State. They received the conference's automatic bid to the FCS Playoffs where they lost to Weber State in the second round.

Previous season 
The Thunderbirds finished the 2016 season 6–5, 5–3 in Big Sky play to finish in a tie for fourth place.

Schedule

 Source: Schedule

Game summaries

at Oregon

at Stephen F. Austin

Northern Iowa

at Sacramento State

Cal Poly

at Weber State

Eastern Washington

at Northern Colorado

North Dakota

at UC Davis

Northern Arizona

FCS Playoffs

Weber State–Second Round

Ranking movements

References

Southern Utah
Southern Utah Thunderbirds football seasons
Big Sky Conference football champion seasons
Southern Utah
Southern Utah Thunderbirds football